Sawang is a village in Khoma Gewog of Lhuntse District in northeastern Bhutan.

References

External links
Satellite map at Maplandia.com

Populated places in Bhutan